Warren Spink (born 4 October 1966) is a former soccer player from Australia. He made 38 appearances for the Socceroos scoring 9 goals, and also represented Australia at under-20 and under-23 levels.

He played for several Australian club sides, as well as in the Malaysian League for the Singapore FA side and the S.League for Geylang United.

Spink was appointed head coach of Cooks Hill United for the 2015 Northern NSW State League Division 1 season.

References

External links
 Career Statistics at OzFootball

1966 births
Living people
Australian soccer players
Soccer players from Melbourne
Association football forwards
Australian expatriate soccer players
Australia international soccer players
Expatriate footballers in Malaysia
Bonnyrigg White Eagles FC players
Footscray JUST players
South Melbourne FC players
Whittlesea Zebras players
Geylang International FC players
Preston Lions FC players
Australian Institute of Sport soccer players
Singapore FA players
Expatriate footballers in Singapore
Australian expatriate sportspeople in Singapore
Singapore Premier League players
Gippsland Falcons players
1996 OFC Nations Cup players